A registration pin is a device intended to hold a piece of film, paper or other material in place during photographic exposure, copying or drawing.

Registration pins are used in offset printing and cartography, to accurately position the different films or plates for multi-color work.

In traditional, hand-drawn animation, the registration pins are often called pegs, and are attached to a peg bar.

Also, in traditional, hand-taped printed circuit board artwork, usually at two or four times actual size. Sometimes on a single transparent base, usually mylar, with Layer 1 being on the front and Layer 2 being on the back, in red and green, respectively, for later "separation" into component parts using a process camera.

Motion picture cameras and related applications
In motion picture cameras, the pin(s) hold the film immovable during exposure.

In certain "professional" motion picture cameras and "step" printers, there may be two registration pins: one is called the "big pin" and it is employed for primary (axial and lateral) registration while the other one is called the "little pin" and it is employed for secondary (axial) registration. With the "big pin"/"little pin" concept, it is not required to employ side pressure or other means to guide the film through the intermittent movement with absolute precision as the "big pin" is fully fitting in the perforation (the "little pin" is not fully fitting in width, but is fully fitting in height; this difference accommodates slight changes in the dimensions of the film media due to changes in relative humidity and possibly other factors such as media age).

This system is employed primarily in high-end "professional" cameras in the West. In the East (the former Soviet Union and its former Satellites), a single registration pin, corresponding to the "big pin", is employed along with side pressure.

Additionally, Western "professional" cameras always employ Bell and Howell (BH) pins whereas Eastern "professional" cameras generally employ Kodak Standard (KS) pins, which standard was originally recommended by the Western standards organizations, but was soundly rejected by Western studios and camera equipment manufacturers. Western "professional" cameras provided to the East during World War II's Lend-Lease program were generally converted to KS pins by the receiving country.

To further improve registration accuracy, the perforations which are utilized for registration are never used for film advancement (i.e., for pull-down).

The above description applies to "professional" applications, which is generally taken to mean film gauges larger than 16mm (i.e., 35mm and 65/70mm).

For 16mm, only, a modified strategy is generally employed, at least for "step" printers which utilize 1R (single-row) perforations.

The lower pin, the "big pin", will be fully fitting in the axial and lateral dimensions but the upper pin, the "little pin", will be fully fitting in the lateral dimension only, for the same reason that the "professional's" "little pin" is fully fitting in the axial dimension only.

This, then, also accomplishes absolute precision, but within the context of "sub-professional" film gauges.

For practical reasons, the 1R 16mm "little pin" is usually spaced two perforations above the 16mm "big pin".

Again for 16mm, only, certain cameras and "step" printers which utilize 2R (two-row) perforations may employ the same strategy as for "professional" applications, but 2R is seldom utilized except for certain high-speed photography and almost never for duplication or prints.

Photography equipment